Henry Maurice Sheffer (1 September 1882 – 17 March 1964) was an American logician.

Life and career
Sheffer was a Polish Jew born in the western Ukraine, who immigrated to the USA in 1892 with his parents and six siblings. He studied at the Boston Latin School before entering Harvard University, learning logic from Josiah Royce, and completing his undergraduate degree in 1905, his master's in 1907, and his Ph.D. in philosophy in 1908.

Sheffer was a postdoctoral fellow at Harvard, and then taught University of Washington, Cornell, the University of Minnesota, the University of Missouri, and City College of New York for one year each. In 1916, he was hired by Harvard as a philosophy professor, where he stayed until he retired in 1952. Scanlan (2000) is a study of Sheffer's life and work.

Likewise, the propositional calculus could be formulated using a single connective, having the truth table either of the logical NAND, usually symbolized with a vertical line called the Sheffer stroke, or its dual logical NOR (usually symbolized with a vertical arrow or with a dagger symbol). Charles Peirce had also discovered these facts in 1880, but the relevant paper was not published until 1933. Sheffer also proposed axioms formulated solely in terms of his stroke.

Sheffer introduced what is now known as the Sheffer stroke in 1913; it became well known only after its use in the 1925 edition of Whitehead and Russell's Principia Mathematica. Sheffer's discovery won great praise from Bertrand Russell, who used it extensively to simplify his own logic, in the second edition of his Principia Mathematica. Because of this comment, Sheffer was something of a mystery man to logicians, especially because Sheffer, who published little in his career, never published the details of this method, only describing it in mimeographed notes and in a brief published abstract. W. V. Quine's Mathematical Logic also made much of the Sheffer stroke.

A Sheffer connective, subsequently, is any connective in a logical system that functions analogously: one in terms of which all other possible connectives in the language can be expressed. For example, they have been developed for quantificational and modal logics as well.

Notes
 Scanlan, Michael, 2000, "The Known and Unknown H. M. Sheffer," The Transactions of the C.S. Peirce Society 36: 193–224.
 Rosen, Kenneth, 2005, "Discrete Mathematics and its Applications" The Foundations: Logic and Proofs 1: 28.

References

1880s births
1964 deaths
American people of Polish-Jewish descent
American people of Ukrainian-Jewish descent
Boston Latin School alumni
Harvard University alumni
Harvard University faculty
American logicians
Ukrainian Jews
Austro-Hungarian emigrants to the United States
Jewish philosophers